A total of 107 teams entered the 1978 FIFA World Cup qualification rounds, which began with the preliminary qualification draw on 20 November 1975 at Guatemala City. Argentina, as the hosts, and West Germany, as the defending champions, qualified automatically, leaving 14 spots open for competition.

The 16 places would be distributed among the continental zones as follows:
Europe (UEFA): 9 or 10 places. One place went to automatic qualifier West Germany, while nine places were contested by 31 teams. The team coming ninth in qualifying would advance to the intercontinental play-offs against a team from CONMEBOL.
South America (CONMEBOL): 3 or 4 places. One place automatically went to host nation Argentina, while the other three places were contested by nine teams. The team coming third in qualifying would advance to the intercontinental play-offs (against a team from UEFA).
North, Central America and Caribbean (CONCACAF): 1 place, contested by 17 teams.
Africa (CAF): 1 place, contested by 26 teams.
Asia (AFC) and Oceania (OFC): 1 place, contested by 22 teams.

A total of 95 teams played at least one qualifying match. A total of 252 qualifying matches were played, and 723 goals were scored (an average of 2.87 per match).

Confederation qualification

AFC and OFC

Iran qualified.

CAF

Tunisia qualified.

CONCACAF

Mexico qualified.

CONMEBOL

First round

Group 1

Group 2

Group 3

Final round

Brazil and Peru qualified.
Bolivia advanced to the inter-confederation play-offs.

UEFA

Hungary advanced to the UEFA–CONMEBOL play-off.

Inter-confederation play-offs: UEFA v CONMEBOL

The teams would play against each other on a home-and-away basis. The winner would qualify.

Qualified teams

The following 16 teams qualified for the 1978 FIFA World Cup:

Top goalscorers

9 goals
 Roberto Bettega

7 goals
 Hans Krankl
 Luis Ramírez Zapata
 Emmanuel Sanon
 Keith Nelson

6 goals
 John Kosmina
 Peter Ollerton
 Mahmoud El Khatib
 Óscar Enrique Sánchez
 Leintz Domingue
 Faisal Al-Dakhil
 Víctor Rangel

Notes
For the first time, over 100 teams entered qualification for the World Cup.
Statistically, this was the most difficult World Cup to qualify for. Taking the two automatic places into account, and excluding twelve teams who withdrew before playing, 95 teams competed for the remaining 14 places (14.7%). The number of spots was increased to 24 for the next World Cup.
Tunisia's victory over Morocco on penalties was the first penalty shootout in World Cup qualification matches.

External links
FIFA World Cup Official Site - 1978 World Cup Qualification
RSSSF - 1978 World Cup Qualification

 
Qualification
FIFA World Cup qualification